Kannudaiyampalayampudur is a village situated in Erode, Tamil Nadu, India.

Villages in Erode district